The Bullet Is Still in My Pocket (translit. Al Rasasa La Tazal Fi Gaiby) is a film directed by Houssam El-Din Mustafa and is based on a story by Ihsan Abdel Quddous. In his 1998 Al-Ahram article "Victory at the Box Office" Hani Mustafa lists it as one of several films dealing with the 1973 war that depict Egyptian society in crisis. It follows the soldier Mohammad (Mahmoud Yassine) as he returns to his village in defeat after the 1967 war, only to be met with contempt and derision. Fatima (Nagwa Ibrahim), the girl he loves has been raped by a high official (Yusuf Shaaban) and Mohammad decides to avenge her by killing the official; he finds an outlet for his frustration when the 1973 war breaks out. This time when he returns to his village he is not shamed by his fellow citizens and the official is exposed as a rapist. Mohammad marries the girl he loves with the bullet still in his pocket.

Synopsis
A young soldier named Mohammad hides in Gaza with a Palestinian family helping fighters escape after the Six-Day War. There, he meets a horse groomer named Marwan al-Akhras but suspects him of being an Israeli spy. Mohammad escapes by sea and returns to his hometown haunted by PTSD from seeing comrades killed in front of him.

He gets a cold reception in his home village as if he were deemed a failure. First staying with his cousin Fatima, he learns that she is to be betrothed to Abbas, an exploitative cooperative farming boss. However, Fatima's father Ibrahim blocks the marriage and Abbas leaves with his proposal rejected, but not before raping her. Abdel Hamid, who replaces Abbas, allows more freedom of speech among the local farmers, while Mohammad leaves to avenge his cousin.

Mohammad enlists in the War of Attrition against Israel soon after. He discovers Marwan's treachery to be as suspected.

Just as Mohammad agrees with Ibrahim to marry Fatima, the Yom Kippur War breaks out. Mohammad goes to war once more, returning with yet more emotional baggage, symbolized by the bullet he carries during the wedding.

Cast
 Mahmoud Yassine (Mohammad)
 Nagwa Ibrahim (Fatima)
 Hussein Fahmy (Marwan)
 Youssef Shaaban (Abbas)
 Abdel Moneim Ibrahim (Azouz)
 Saeed Saleh (Khalil)
 Salah El-Saadany (Raouf)
 Muḥyī Ismāʻīl
 Ahmed Al Jaziri (Fatima's father Abdullah)
 Ihsan Sharif (Mohammad's mother)
 Hayat Kandeel (Zainab)

Cast 
Ihsan Abd al-Qudus.
Mahmoud Yassine.
Nagwa Ibrahim.
Hussein Fahmy.
Sa'eed Saleh. 
Youssef Chaban.
Houssam El-Din Mustafa.
Youssef Shaaban

References

External links
The Bullet Is Still in My Pocket (Only Arabic)

Films about the Arab–Israeli conflict
Films set in 1967
Films about the Israel Defense Forces
Egyptian war drama films
Yom Kippur War
1970s Arabic-language films
Films set in the 1970s
Films set in 1973
1970s war drama films